John Divilly is a former Gaelic footballer who played for the Kilkerrin-Clonberne club. He won the All-Ireland in 1998 and was one of the main players interviewed in the documentary A Year Til Sunday, which used hidden cameras to tell the story of Galway's journey to winning the All-Ireland Football Championship in 1998. He is the manager of the NUIM Sigerson Cup team which was victorious over UUJ in February 2010.

He was appointed selector and backs coach of the Galway senior football team in October 2019, hoping to lead them to their first All Ireland since 2001.

He was a columnist for the Irish Examiner between 2017 and 2021.

References
 Gaelic Football - John Divilly

Year of birth missing (living people)
Living people
Gaelic football coaches
Gaelic football selectors
Gaelic games writers and broadcasters
Galway inter-county Gaelic footballers
Irish columnists
Irish Examiner people
Kilkerrin-Clonberne Gaelic footballers
Winners of one All-Ireland medal (Gaelic football)